Kukavica (Serbian Cyrillic: Кукавица) is a mountain in southern Serbia, near the town of Vladičin Han. Its highest peak Vlajna has an elevation of 1442 meters above sea level.

Gallery

References

Mountains of Serbia
Rhodope mountain range